Morvin is an unincorporated community in Clarke County, Alabama, United States.

Geography

References

Unincorporated communities in Alabama
Unincorporated communities in Clarke County, Alabama